Beetree Creek is a  long 2nd order tributary to the Swannanoa River in Buncombe County, North Carolina.

Course
Beetree Creek rises about 0.5 miles southeast of Bearpen Knob in Buncombe County.  Beetree Creek then flows south then southwest to meet the Swannanoa River about 1 mile northwest of Swannanoa, North Carolina.

Watershed
Beetree Creek drains  of area, receives about 49.6 in/year of precipitation, has a topographic wetness index of 264.89 and is about 92% forested.

References

Rivers of North Carolina
Bodies of water of Buncombe County, North Carolina